Monterey is a suburb in southern Sydney, in the state of New South Wales, Australia 15 km south of the Sydney central business district and is part of the St George area. Monterey is in the local government area of the Bayside Council.

Monterey sits on the western shores of Botany Bay. Lady Robinsons Beach and Cook Park run along the eastern border. Scarborough Park, which features a pond, runs along the western border. The suburb is mostly residential with a small group of shops on Chuter Avenue, near the intersection of Scarborough Street.

The 1987 Music Video for Mental As Anything's single "He's just no good for you" was filmed in Scarborough Street, Monterey.

History
Monterey was originally part of Brighton-Le-Sands and Ramsgate. As the area developed, street names with a Californian influence were selected such as Hollywood, Monterey, Pasadena and Culver. A small group of shops were built on Chuter Avenue, near Monterey Street. When the post office opened here it was known as the Monterey post office. Rockdale Council wanted to create a new suburb, although not everyone agreed with this name as some thought it was too American, especially with some of the street names already in the area. Since most people were in favor, Monterey was officially declared a suburb in 1972. 

Scarborough Park was once part of Pat Moore's Swamp or Patmore Swamp. It was named by the Hon. Thomas Holt after the English coastal town of Scarborough, North Yorkshire.

Population
According to the 2016 census of Population, there were 4,532 people usually resident in Monterey. 56.6% of people were born in Australia. The next most common countries of birth were Greece 5.6% and Egypt 3.7%. 45.4% of people spoke only English at home. Other languages spoken at home included Greek 17.7%, Arabic 7.3%, Spanish 4.1% and Macedonian 2.8%. The most common responses for religion were Eastern Orthodox 26.5%, Catholic 23.4%, No Religion 13.5% and Anglican 7.4%.

Landmarks
 Scarborough Park, Tanner Reserve, Cook Park
 Lady Robinsons Beach

References

Suburbs of Sydney
Botany Bay
Bayside Council